Nossa Senhora da Tourega is a former civil parish in the municipality of Évora, Portugal. In 2013, the parish merged into the new parish Nossa Senhora da Tourega e Nossa Senhora de Guadalupe. The population in 2011 was 686, in an area of 196.19 km².

History
In 1864, then known as Ourega, the parish had approximately 576 inhabitants. By 1878, that figure had grown to 688 inhabitants, when it was now commonly referred to as Tourega (Nossa Senhora da Assunção).

Between 1911 and 1920 the parish was annexed to the neighbouring parish of Nossa Senhora da Graça do Divor, which was only remedied on 18 October 1926 (Decree-Law No.12/509). The census of 1930 identified a population of 1186, which in 1936 included the parish of São Brás do Regedouro.

Until 22 August 2003, it was known as Nossa Senhora da Torega.

Geography
Nossa Senhora da Tourega, is a rural civil parish in the municipality of Évora, with its parish seat in the village of Valverde. Access to this community is accomplished through the EN 380 (Évora-Alcáçovas).

Architecture

Prehistoric
 Anta Grande do Zambujeiro, a prehistoric dolmen, excavated near the northern border, considered one of the largest remaining dolmens in the Iberian Peninsula, and excavated in 1958, to the discovery of prehistoric slabs, copper artefacts and ceramics, now on exhibition in the Museum of Évora;
 Antas do Barrocal
 Cromlech of Almendres
 Megalithic monuments of Vale de Rodrigo

Archaeological
 Roman villa of Tourega

Religious
 Convent of Bom Jesus de Valverde

References

Former parishes of Portugal
Freguesias of Évora